This is a summary of notable incidents that have taken place at amusement parks, water parks or other attractions owned and/or operated by Herschend Family Entertainment Corporation. This list is not intended to be a comprehensive list of every such event, but only those that have a significant impact on the parks or park operations, or are otherwise significantly newsworthy.

The term incidents refers to major accidents, injuries, or deaths that occur at a Herschend-owned or -operated facility. While these incidents were required to be reported to regulatory authorities due to where they occurred, they usually fall into one of the following categories:
Caused by negligence on the part of the guest. This can be a refusal to follow specific ride safety instructions, or deliberate intent to break park rules.
The result of a guest's known, or unknown, health issues.
Negligence on the part of the park, either by ride operator or maintenance.
Act of God or a generic accident (e.g. slipping and falling), that is not a direct result of an action on anybody's part.

Dollywood

Dollywood Express
On April 14, 2004, a female passenger fell out of one of the train's carriages while it was in motion. An investigation determined that a drink was spilled on the woman, who then lost her balance and fell out of the train. The attraction was closed after the incident but was re-opened the next day after it was determined to be operating normally. The passenger was taken to UT Medical Center in Knoxville, Tennessee and was released a day later.

FireChaser Express

 On May 22, 2021, at approximately 2:50 P.M, 2 full trains of passengers were stranded for 2 hours after a flywheel was flung from the switch track just outside of the ride's station.
On April 23, 2019, 40 passengers were stranded for 20 minutes when the safety sensor tripped.

Lightning Rod

On June 13, 2016, after grand opening, the coaster was shut down temporarily due to a nation-wide mechanical recall.

Mountain Blown Glass Shop
On July 12, 2020, a craftsman suffered injuries while working on a project inside the shop. It was the second incident that occurred at the park during this year, occurring only a day after a themed decoration fell on top of three people.

Parking lot
On June 29, 2019, a parking lot tram collided with another, injuring at least 22 guests. Six people were taken to a nearby hospital by ambulance.

Thunder Express
In 1989, on opening day, an incoming train bumped a second train parked in the station, slightly injuring 18 people.

Timber Tower
On June 18, 2007, 44 people were stuck on Timber Tower for several hours.

Waltzing Swinger
In December 2013, a woman suffered a brain injury after falling from the ride.

Wilderness Pass
On July 11, 2020, three guests were injured when a chain decoration fell on top of them as they were walking in the themed area of the park near the Mystery Mine attraction. Two of them were taken to the hospital while another person, who was also involved in the incident, declined transport.

Kentucky Kingdom

Chang
On April 6, 1997, the ride was temporarily shut down one day after its official grand opening and remained closed the remainder of the week. A malfunction occurred on the lift hill chain and passengers had to be evacuated off the coaster train they were on after it abruptly stopped on its incline.

Hurricane Bay
On June 22, 2019, an incident occurred on the water park's Deluge waterslide. Three people were riding in the same raft when it grazed an empty raft that was being removed. One of the riders was taken to a nearby hospital after complaining of neck pain.

Mile High Falls
On July 28, 2018, a boat carrying 13 passengers derailed just after it descended down the drop. Five people were taken to the park's first aid center where two were treated with minor injuries. Two more were taken to a local hospital. Park employees shifted the boat back into place. The ride was closed for inspection and reopened a few days later.

Starchaser
On July 26, 1994, five unidentified riders were injured when two cars collided in an incident that inspectors said was due to operator error. After the accident, the park filed a lawsuit against Louisville, Kentucky television station WHAS-TV for reporting on the accident in a misleading and malicious manner. The station had inaccurately reported that the ride malfunctioned, was dangerous, and that the park had removed a "key component" of the ride. The station lost the lawsuit and was ordered to pay US$3 million to the park.

Superman: Tower of Power

 On June 21, 2007 (park then operating as Six Flags Kentucky Kingdom), a 13-year-old girl from Louisville, Kentucky had both feet cut off above the ankle when one of the ride's cables snapped during operation.  In reaction to this accident, at least nine similar rides around the world were closed for inspection at Gröna Lund in Stockholm, Sweden, Kennywood in Pittsburgh, and at parks run by Six Flags, Cedar Fair, and PARC Management. On July 3, 2007, the victim's family released a statement stating that doctors reattached her right foot. However, her left leg was amputated below the knee.
On July 13, 2007, the victim's family filed a lawsuit for unspecified damages, claiming that the park did not properly maintain the ride. On November 29, 2007, a judge in the Jefferson Circuit Court said that Six Flags could dismantle the ride beginning February 1, 2008.  As of December 1, 2007, the ride's cable was still in storage awaiting lab tests. On May 30, 2008, the Kentucky Department of Agriculture released their report on the accident, concluding that the accident was caused by a deteriorated cable, as well as poor operator training. Had the operator acted in a timely manner to emergency stop the ride, the report states, the victim would have only suffered minor injuries. The report also stated that the park was fined $1,000 for not properly maintaining the ride. Park officials admitted in deposition that only visual inspections of the ride's cables were performed, not hands-on inspections, that cables were not lubricated monthly, and that the ride's cables were not regularly replaced. However, it was not possible to determine any one factor which specifically caused the cable to snap.  On November 21, 2008, a settlement to "provide lifetime care" was reached between Kentucky Kingdom and the victim's family.

T3
On July 29, 1997, 14 passengers were left stranded on the roller coaster for more than four hours after the train stopped on the lift hill. All were safely evacuated off the ride and lowered  to the ground.
On June 2, 2018, two trains collided in the station. Five guests were treated at the park's health center, and one of those riders were subsequently taken to the hospital. The ride reopened two days later but running only one train instead of two, pending further investigation. A park spokesperson stated that they believe the accident may have been caused due to a lightning strike that may have affected the coaster's electronic systems.
On August 25, 2018, a woman was hit in the face by one of her accessories she brought into the park while riding the roller coaster. She suffered a cut on her temple and was taken to the hospital for treatment and recovered. The ride was shut down for inspection and later reopened.

Vampire
On July 22, 1990, 24 passengers had to be evacuated by going down a staircase on the side of the tracks after the train stopped on one of its inversions. A park spokesperson claimed that the coaster's brakes were automatically triggered by a safety device due to the tracks being wet at the time the ride was in operation.
On April 7, 1999, the ride stranded 27 people  for as long as four hours. For the inconvenience, the staff gave the riders stuffed animals and water bottles. The incident was the result of a malfunction in the ride's automatic braking system.
On May 29, 1999, the ride stranded 26 people for four hours. It was similar to the incident that happened one month before. Firemen were able to get the riders off using cherry pickers, and nobody was injured.

Silver Dollar City

Fire in the Hole

On May 1, 1972, a 67-year-old woman from Rogers, Arkansas suffered injuries after falling off a car near the end of its run. She was taken to Skaggs Community Hospital after being reported in satisfactory condition due to fracturing her nose and right arm.
On July 9, 1980, a 23-year-old man was killed and a 27-year-old woman was injured while riding Fire in the Hole. A train on the roller coaster was accidentally switched to a maintenance track and storage area, which had low-hanging structures across the track. The male passenger's head struck one of these structures, killing him. The accident was ruled a case of human error, and after an investigation, the attraction re-opened two days later. The overhanging structures were later removed from the maintenance area.

Lost River Of The Ozarks
On July 15, 2002, a section of the queue line collapsed, injuring 19 people.

Other incidents involving guests
On December 30, 2019, a 64-year-old woman from Lambert, Mississippi was injured after falling off a parking lot tram. Her husband claimed that she suffered a brain hemorrhage and facial fractures during the incident.

Outlaw Run

On July 28, 2015, a 10-year-old girl complained of neck pain after riding the roller coaster. She was taken to a nearby hospital and later recovered.

ThuNderaTion

In July 2022, a maintenance worker died due to an injury to the head while testing out the coaster. The ride closed for two weeks following the incident.

Frisco Silver Dollar Line Steam Train
On October 26th, 2022, 6 park guests and 1 employee were injured when the Frisco Silver Dollar Line Steam Train derailed as it was rounding a corner causing three passenger cars to overturn.

Wild Adventures

On June 3, 2011, Splash Island lifeguards identified an unresponsive 3-year-old girl in Paradise River. A lifeguard, a supervisor and a park security officer performed CPR on the child and revived her before she was transported by emergency medical services to South Georgia Medical Center.

Former properties

Ride the Ducks

The duck boats operated by Ride the Ducks have been involved in a number of incidents. In July 2010 one of the amphibious vehicles stalled on the Delaware River in Philadelphia, Pennsylvania and was struck by a barge, sinking the duck boat and killing two of the passengers, who were Hungarian tourists. The National Transportation Safety Board determined that the probable cause of the accident was the tugboat operator's inattention to his duties.

On May 8, 2015, a Ride the Ducks boat struck and killed a 68-year-old Beaumont, Texas woman crossing the street in Philadelphia, Pennsylvania's Chinatown section. Witnesses at the scene say that the woman crossed against a red light while viewing content on a tablet and was struck while in the boat's front blind spot. The incident is still being investigated.

Ride the Ducks was sold to Ripley Entertainment in December 2017 and is no longer a Herschend property. The sale occurred before the Table Rock Lake duck boat accident in July 2018 near Branson, Missouri, where a Ride the Ducks boat sank on Table Rock Lake during a thunderstorm, killing 17 passengers.

See also
Amusement park accidents

References

Herschend